A bald arch is an arch featuring decay on the crucial keystones in stone or masonry buildings. Left unchecked, the progression of the condition will eventually lead to the failure of the arch and any structures supported by it.

Causes 
The structural degradation of arches can occur for a variety of reasons. The stones or masonry components that make up an arch are vulnerable to physical and chemical attack over long periods of time. Sources of damage include atmospheric conditions, human induced mechanical stress, improper design, and natural disturbances like earthquakes or wildlife.

Ground shifting 
Movement of the ground beneath an arch will eventually destroy it by changing the mechanical relationship between stones in the arch. An arch will evenly distribute forces across the surfaces of each stone when it is properly emplaced. Moving the ground below the arch will negatively affect the distribution of stress. An arch will slump in the center if the two sides move apart. If the sides are moved closer together, a hinge will form in the arch, increasing the stress on that area. Arches can also become angled away from level, inducing forces that are not normal to the faces of the individual stones. 

The ground can shift over long periods of time for many reasons: earthquakes, frost, swelling clays, tree roots, animal burrows, and unstable soils all have the potential to move the foundation of a building.

Weathering 

The weather plays an important role in destroying stone structures. Daily or annual freeze/thaw cycles cause water trapped in cracks to expand, breaking up the stones or causing them to shift from their original setting. Frost heaving in the ground may move the structure, making it unstable. Precipitation can also be detrimental for certain materials. Limestone and cement are subject to weathering from rain. Natural rainwater has a pH of 5.6 due to carbon dioxide in the atmosphere. This is low enough to dissolve the calcium carbonate that constitutes limestone and cement. Air pollution can greatly enhance this effect by dropping the pH of the rainwater. In the eastern United States, the pH of rainwater can be as low as 2.0.

Rain can also dissolve salts from the stone or other sources and redeposit the salt into cracks in the stones or between them. The salts will then crystalize as the water evaporates, putting pressure on the edges of the crack and causing the stones to move or chip. This effect is most pronounced in coastal and urban environments. Salt damage is also prevalent in cities that employ salts to deice roads and sidewalks.

If an arch includes mortar between the stones, the mortar becomes a likely point of weathering. As the mortar decays, the stones on either side will become unsupported and lead to failure.

Vibration 
Human activities causing vibration can inadvertently damage stone arches, like other structural elements. The vibrations caused by road traffic can cause stones to grind one another and shift over time. The arch may eventually become unstable and collapse.

Design flaws 
Arches that lack adequate support on the sides will slump and fail. All arches convert some of the weight of the structure into a horizontal outwards thrust. The structure may be stable for a time, but the arch will push the walls around it outwards continuously. This is prevented by proper engineering. Arches can be supported by a buttress on the outer wall, thick, heavy wall construction between the arch and the corner, or by using arches in a series so that each arch is opposed by two others on its sides.

Prevention 
The bald arch condition can be prevented by taking precautions during the construction phase and by properly maintaining the stonework over time. Ground movement can be avoided by using a solid foundation. Removing vegetation from near the foundation and preventing animals from burrowing will help to keep the foundation stable.

Frost damage can be reduced by ensuring drainage around the building and by keeping the roof in good condition. This will keep water from saturating the stone and cracking it during cold weather. Keeping water off of the stone will also prevent salt and acid rain damage. Unfortunately, it is not always possible to keep the rainwater off the walls. Paint can be applied to the stones to protect them from rain and pollution, but this is often rejected because it alters the appearance of historic buildings. Cleaning the stone regularly can help to reduce the effects of chemical weathering. Pollutants accumulate on the exterior surfaces of the stone. They react with the stone and degrade the outer portions. This will degrade the appearance of the stone and eventually weaken it to the point of failure. The most popular methods are scrubbing with fresh water or steam cleaning. This is very expensive and time-consuming for a large building. It may be impossible to treat the entire building in one season, and scaffoldings will need to be erected to reach the higher parts.

Restoration 
It is often desirable to preserve an arch because they are common in historic and monumental architecture. Numerous methods are employed for restoring or preserving degraded arches. The first stage in restoring an arch is to evaluate the structure to determine how serious the damage is and what technique is best suited for repair. An architect or engineer will measure the rate of deformation over some period of time, to see how fast the arch is degrading. The deformation could have occurred immediately after construction during the settling period. If that is the case, it is less urgent to repair the damage.

The goal of the restoration is an important consideration. If the goal is only to prevent further deterioration, there will be less work than if the goal is to restore the original condition.

Shoring 
An arch may be shored up by adding new materials to the structure. The mode of failure determines how the arch should be reinforced. The most common failure for arches is an outwards movement of stones near the top. An arch will constantly apply pressure sideways, so the outwards pressure must be managed. If the arch is failing sideways, a buttress can be built to contain the lateral thrust. Steel tensioning rods can take the place of an external buttress to maintain the original appearance in some cases.

Removing any stone from an arch without preparing the entire arch will cause it to fail. The arch must be supported before any work can be done. This is done with a falsework of wooden trusses, similar to how the arch is initially built. The entire arch is supported by the wooden falsework. Individual stones can then be removed and repaired or replaced. Repointing or grouting the joints between stones can greatly improve the integrity of the structure. If the arch has slumped it can be shored up using a hydraulic jack, and then the stones can be pushed into place and repointed. This can be a very demanding job, since any structures supported by the arch will need to be supported while the arch is repaired. 

The arches also can be reinforced using steel trusses. Some opponents believe that this degrades the appearance of the arches, that it makes them look like dental braces. Without this support, the building would be structurally unsound.

Further reading 
 The Observer’s Book of Architecture– John Penoyre and Michael Ryan
 The Churchwarden’s Guide to Church Maintenance– James Redcock

References 

Medieval architecture
Arches and vaults